Genguvarpatti is a Village in Periyakulam Taluk of Theni district  in Madurai Region at the Indian state of Tamil Nadu.

Population 
According to the 2001 census, Genguvarpatti had a population of 10,569. Males constitute 51% of the population while females constitute the other 49%. Genguvarpatti has an average literacy rate of 57%, lower than the national average of 59.5%; male literacy is 67%, and female literacy is 47%. 13% of the population is under 6.

Climate 
During the Southwest monsoon, the village receives the majority of its rainfall.

Economy 
The Manjalar  crosses this village. This water and monsoon rain is used to cultivate crops throughout the year.

Agriculture is the backbone of the town; most of the residents cultivate paddy, sugarcane, cotton, etc.

References

Villages in Theni district